Indrė Kirjanovaitė (born 5 May 1989) is a Lithuanian former footballer who played as a defender. She has been a member of the Lithuania women's national team.

References

1989 births
Living people
Women's association football defenders
Lithuanian women's footballers
Lithuania women's international footballers
Gintra Universitetas players